The Buntine Oration is a biennial invited presentation and speech made at the conference of the Australian College of Educators (ACE).  It was established in 1960 by the four children of Dr Walter Murray Buntine who survived him – Dr R. M. Buntine, Dr M. A. Buntine, Dr R. D. Buntine, and Mrs. D. M. G. Wilson – in his memory.  The inaugural oration was given by Peter Karmel (who had, himself, attended Caulfield Grammar School from 1929 to 1939) in 1962 at the third annual ACE conference and the most recent was in 2008.

Buntine Family 
Dr Walter Buntine (1866–1953) had a significant role in the development of education in the Australian state of Victoria from his position as headmaster of Caulfield Grammar School (1896–1932).  His son, Dr M. Arnold Buntine (1898–1975), was an Australian rules footballer who played with St Kilda before studying education and earning a PhD from the University of Edinburgh. Prior to World War II, Arnold was headmaster of Camberwell Grammar School in Victoria and then the Hale School in Western Australia.  He served at Tobruk and in Syria as a captain in the 2/28th Battalion.  Ultimately rising to Lieutenant-Colonel, he led the 2/11th Battalion.  He returned to the Hale School in 1944, returning to Victoria in 1945 as headmaster of Geelong College.  Arnold was married to Gladys (Jim) Buntine (1901–1992), who was the Chief Commissioner of the Australian Girl Guides from 1962 until 1968 and an advocate for the importance of education.  She was awarded first an OBE and later an MBE for her services to youth.  Robert Buntine (1929–2014), their son, had leadership roles at The King's School and Newington College in Sydney.  Professor Mark Buntine of Curtin University of Technology is the most current of the Buntine family of educators.

List of orations 
The Buntine Oration has been delivered by many highly recognised people.  Paul Hasluck was the Australian Minister for External Affairs at the time he delivered the 1964 oration, going on to become Governor-General of Australia in 1969.  Zelman Cowen was the Governor-General at the time of the 1980 oration.  Michael Somare was elected to the first national parliament of Papua New Guinea in 1972, becoming chief minister by the time of the 1974; he became the country's first Prime Minister when independence was granted in 1975.  2006 orator Peter Doherty shared the 1996 Nobel Prize in Physiology or Medicine and was the 1997 Australian of the Year.   Two High Court justices have given the oration (Robert French and Michael Kirby), as has the Chancellor of the Australian National University ("Nugget" Coombs) and the inaugural President of the ACE, James Darling.

Footnotes 

Education in Australia